Fordwich  is a market town and a civil parish in east Kent, England, on the River Stour, northeast of Canterbury.

It is the smallest community by population in Britain with a town council. Its population increased by 30 between 2001 and 2011.

History
Fordwich is listed in the 1086 Domesday Book as a small village. The town grew in the Middle Ages as a port for boats on their way upriver to Canterbury. All of the Caen stone used by the Normans to rebuild Canterbury Cathedral in the 12th and 13th centuries was landed at Fordwich. It later became a limb of the Cinque Ports. It lost its status as a town in 1880 when it no longer had a Mayor and Corporation. However, in a reorganisation in 1972, Fordwich was again made a town. Fordwich Town Hall was rebuilt in or shortly before 1544.

The ancient Church of St Mary the Virgin, now redundant but open to the public, and in the care of the Churches Conservation Trust, contains part of a carved sarcophagus reputed to have contained the remains of St Augustine of Canterbury. The 16th-century building next the Town Hall, now known as Watergate House, was the family home of John and Gregory Blaxland, early 19th-century pioneers of Australia.

Palaeolithic archaeology 
During the 1920s-1930s, a significant amount of Palaeolithic handaxes were discovered during industrial quarrying to the west side of Fordwich.  In total, these handaxes numbered some 330 pieces, along with flakes from lithic construction.  During 2020, Cambridge University dug exploratory trenches at the same western location, discovering deposits of Palaeolithic archaeology, counting 251 in-situ Lower-Palaeolithic flakes and scrapers from Acheulean industry.  In 2022, Archaeologist Peter Knowles [Professor David Bridgland  Professor, Archaeology, Mark White  ] of Durham University made a handaxe discovery from an area called Moat Rough in Fordwich.  Moat Rough is of particular interest archaeologically because the ground there has been left fallow for decades with no quarrying or development.  The new handaxe discovery at Moat Rough revealed that gravel terraces bearing Palaeolithic archaeology running underneath Fordwich are much more widespread than previously thought, indicating that there is much more research on early-man that needs to be done there.

Community 

There are two pubs in the town, the George & Dragon and Fordwich Arms, which boasts a Michelin star. Fordwich gained angling and fishing repute from Izaak Walton for its "Fordidge trout", one of the largest types found.

See also
 Broughton in Furness with as few as 529 residents
 Stockbridge in Hampshire, with a population of 592 
 Manningtree in Essex, another claimant for smallest town in England, with 700 people in 20 hectares
 Llanwrtyd Wells in Wales, another claimant for smallest town in Britain, has a population of 850

References

External links

Fordwich Town Council

Populated places in Kent
Civil parishes in Kent
Towns in Kent
City of Canterbury